Pchelintsev is a surname. It may refer to:

Alexey Pchelintsev (born 1991), Kazakhstani ski jumper
Denis Pchelintsev (born 1979), Russian football player and coach
Valeri Pchelintsev (born 1976), Russian football player
Yevgeni Pchelintsev (born 1976), Russian football player

Russian-language surnames